Errol Attilio Rausse (born May 18, 1959) is a Canadian former ice hockey player.

Rausse was born in Quesnel, British Columbia. Drafted in 1979 by the Washington Capitals, Rausse played parts of three seasons with the Capitals, spending most of his time in the minor leagues with the Hershey Bears.  He remained with the organization until 1983 when he would leave North America and play eleven seasons in Italy with Alleghe HC before finally retiring from active play in 1994.

Career statistics

Awards
 WCHL Second All-Star Team – 1978

External links

Profile at hockeydraftcentral.com

1959 births
Living people
Canadian ice hockey left wingers
HC Alleghe players
Hershey Bears players
Ice hockey people from British Columbia
Kamloops Chiefs players
Seattle Breakers players
SG Cortina players
Washington Capitals draft picks
Washington Capitals players
Canadian expatriate ice hockey players in Italy